Another Kind of Wedding (also titled Someone Else’s Wedding) is a 2017 Canadian comedy-drama film written and directed by Pat Kiely and starring Kathleen Turner, Kevin Zegers, Jessica Paré, Jacob Tierney, Jessica Parker Kennedy, Luke Kirby, Wallace Shawn and Frances Fisher.

Cast
Kevin Zegers as Kurt
Jessica Paré as Carrie
Kathleen Turner as Barbara
Jessica Parker Kennedy as Louisa
Wallace Shawn as Albert
Frances Fisher as Tammy
Luke Kirby as Misha
Jacob Tierney as Matthew

Production
Filming began in Montreal in December 2016.

Release
The film was released in theaters and on demand on May 11, 2018.

Reception
The film has a 60% rating on Rotten Tomatoes based on five reviews.

Noel Murray of the Los Angeles Times gave the film a positive review and wrote, "At its best, Another Kind of Wedding understands how hard it can be for families to look past their own burdensome self-mythology, to see each other again as just people."

Tiffany Tchobanian of Film Threat awarded the film two and a half stars out of five.

References

External links
 
 

Canadian comedy-drama films
2010s English-language films
2017 films
2017 comedy-drama films
2010s Canadian films